Senator Hazelbaker may refer to:

Frank A. Hazelbaker (1878–1939), Montana State Senate
Frank W. Hazelbaker (1912–1990), Montana State Senate